This page lists the television broadcasts which had the most viewers within individual countries, as measured by ratings and research agencies in those countries. The research methodology and choice of statistics varies between sources, and is explained in individual sections.

Many events are watched simultaneously around the world, and recorded programs exported to multiple countries, but it is difficult to collate reliable figures for global audiences. Those countries where reliable figures are available may use incompatible methodologies, such as the minimum age of counted viewers, and what proportion of the program must be watched when measuring the "reach" of a program, rather than its average or peak audience. Figures published by organisers and journalists are routinely exaggerated or misrepresented, claiming billions of viewers worldwide, where independent analysis suggests few if any broadcasts have reached 1 billion viewers.

Although numbers are unreliable, it is generally accepted that the most widely watched events worldwide are international sporting events such as the Olympic Games and FIFA World Cup, with annual events such as the Super Bowl in the U.S., and the UEFA Champions League finals in Europe picking up large regional audiences. Record-breaking audiences are also claimed for news events such as the 1969 Apollo 11 moon landing, and music events such as the 1985 Live Aid benefit concert.

Australia

Most-watched broadcasts of all time (total viewers)
The following is David Dale's approximate ranking of the most-watched television shows of all time in Australia using data from Nielsen Corporation and OzTAM.

Note: the funeral of Princess Diana, the Wedding of Prince Charles and the Wedding of Prince William were all carried by all 4 major networks and are counted together.

Most viewed broadcasts since 2001 (OzTAM 5 City Metro Average) 
The following table is a list of the most viewed programs based on the OzTAM 5 City Metro Average rating system. It does not include regional numbers (40% of the population) and uses the average viewership, not the peak viewership. Also note these ratings are not comparable with ratings before 2001 due to different methodologies used after this time.

Brazil

Canada

The two most-watched television broadcasts in Canadian history occurred during the 2010 Winter Olympics in Vancouver. For the gold medal game of the men's hockey tournament at the 2010 Winter Olympics, played between the United States and Canada, confirmed 16.6 million Canadians watched the whole game, roughly one-half of the country's entire population. A groundbreaking 26.5 million Canadians watched some part of the game, over 80 percent of the country's 34-million-person population. According to multiple sources, 13.3 million Canadians watched the games' opening ceremony, which was the previous record.

Many believed the final game of the 1972 Summit Series had up to 18 million viewers, but only 4.3 million TVs tuned in. This statistic does not represent the reality that most school children (representing the tail end of the baby-boom i.e. a large population) nationwide watched the game in gymnasiums on only one or two TVs. 10.3 million people watched the ice hockey gold medal final of the 2002 Winter Olympics.

China
China Central Television's Spring Festival Gala has regularly attracted between 700 million to 1.17 billion viewers annually.

The CCTV's main evening news broadcast Xinwen Lianbo has a daily audience of around 135 million people, and it is also one of the most expensive shows in the world per advertising spots, with its 2013 advertising slots selling for a record of 5.4 billion yuan.

The Legend of Bruce Lee (2008), based on the life of Bruce Lee, has been watched by over  viewers in China, making it the most-watched Chinese television drama series of all time, as of 2017.

A Chinese boxer Zou Shiming's professional boxing debut on 6 April 2013 generated an estimated 300 million viewers. Another professional boxer Qiu Xiaojun attracted around 200 million people for his fight against Ghanaian fighter Raymond Commey on 12 February 2016.

Denmark 
The following are the ten most watched programs from 1992 onwards.

France

Germany 

Note: The UEFA Euro 2008 final is missing from the list, because the lengthy trophy presentation was included into the official ratings. The game itself was watched by 28.05 million viewers.

India

India measures the viewership of shows through TRP (Television Rating Point). Shows used to have higher ratings in 2000s as compared to present decade. The present shows that regularly score above or around the 3.5 mark are Kumkum Bhagya, and its spin off Kundali Bhagya along with Yeh Rishta Kya Kehlata Hai. Sometimes these shows touch 4 which is still quite low as compared to highest rated shows of the last decade. Other than that Naagin is the only show now that scores above 4.7. All of these shows are produced by the same banner (Balaji Telefilms) except Yeh Rishta Kya Kehlata Hai. Currently, Bigg Boss 13 has been the most watched show of 2020, recording an 11.3 TRP for the Final and an average of 8.3 TRP on regular episodes, being the most watched reality show in India. Ironically, 2.5–3.5 TRP was considered an average in the 2000s era of classic serials. The most-watched channel for years has been StarPlus, then Zee TV with major competition from Colors. Mahabharat (19881990), the television adaptation of Indian epic Mahabharata, had a share of 97.8% among Indian viewers.

Aamir Khan's talk show Satyamev Jayate (20122014) drew an estimated audience of 600million viewers in India. The 2016 ICC World Twenty20 cricket cup was watched by an estimated 730million viewers in India, with India vs. Pakistan being the most widely watched live event during the tournament.

Most viewed broadcasts

Ireland
A list of most-watched shows in the Republic of Ireland in the 21st century was released in January 2015. The Late Late Toy Show held the top six spots, with the 2014 edition drawing 1,593,000 viewers: over one-third of the country's population. Other high-performing shows were Who Wants to be a Millionaire?, crime drama Love/Hate, Mrs. Brown's Boys, The Sunday Game, UEFA Euro 2012 and the Eurovision Song Contest.

Japan
The following list is for Japanese anime only. The list covers broadcasts after 26 September 1977. Video Research had previously recorded an episode of the 1960s Astro Boy anime that earned a 40.3% rating.

The following is a list of the most-watched films of all time on Nippon TV (NTV), .

Mexico
A list of most-watched shows in the Mexico, Televisa and TV Azteca broadcasters (Liga MX Apertura and 
Clausura), Boxing, 1968 Summer Olympics in Mexico City,  (FIFA World Cup hosts 1970 & 1986), some concerts like Maná's Unidos por La Paz at Estadio Azteca in March 2001;  in 2007, the last episode of La Fea Más Bella", Funeral events like Chespirito at December 2014 the creator of TV Series El Chavo and El Chapulín Colorado, and Celebration of Mexican political anniversaries in 2010 celebrate independence from Spain also called Bicentenario 2010, had an average audience of over 40 million views in Mexican Television.

Netherlands
Since 2002 Stichting KijkOnderzoek is keeping track of viewership of Dutch television channels. All programs with a viewership over 7 million since the start of tracking are shown in the table below.

New Zealand
In 2011, the television website Throng published a list of the 12 most-watched television broadcasts in New Zealand from 1995 to 2011. This is based on average viewership of the program, but it does not include broadcasts from before 1995 or after 2011.

The Rugby World Cup has frequently had large audiences – the Rugby World Cup 2011 final, and a semi-final, both had an average audience of over 2 million.

Philippines

AGB Nielsen
The following table shows the all-time highest rating television shows in Mega Manila as tallied by AGB Nielsen since 1992. However, ratings are from a single highest recorded episode of the show (in the case of the TV series) and it is not the average over-all ratings for the whole season or series.

Poland
List of the 10 most-watched television broadcasts since the beginning of telemetry research in Poland (since 1997) by Nielsen Media Research:

Portugal

South Korea
Viewership ratings are provided by two companies in South Korea, AGB Nielsen Media Research and TNmS. Originally Media Service Korea was the only company providing such information, and it was later acquired by Nielsen Media Research. In 1999 TNS Media Korea also began such service, and later changed its name to TNmS. AGB collects viewership data based on 2050 households, while TNmS has 2000 households with measuring devices. Drama ratings usually vary between the two companies by 2–3%.

Sweden
Statistics from Mediamätning Skandinavien.

Most-watched programmes per year

Most-watched sport events per year

United Kingdom

United States

Though the Apollo 11 Moon landing is the most watched television event in American history, it is considered a news event, meaning that NBC's live telecast of Super Bowl XLIX in 2015 holds the record for the largest average viewership of any live single-network U.S. television broadcast, with 114.4 million viewers. During this broadcast, the halftime show was watched by 118.5 million viewers. The previous live telecast Super Bowl XLV in February 2011 helped Fox become the first television network in the United States to be watched by at least 100 million American viewers by average for a single primetime night of programming. Moreover,  Super Bowl telecasts account for 22 of the most-watched television broadcasts based on overall viewership in U.S. television history. Fox's live telecast of Super Bowl LI in 2017 currently holds the largest total viewership (those who watched any part of the broadcast) in U.S. television history, with 172 million viewers.

Most-watched broadcasts

See also 

 List of most watched television interviews

References

Sources
 
Man Vs Wild Episode Featuring PM Modi Was ‘most Trending Televised Event’, Claims Bear Grylls
PM Narendra Modi's 'Man vs Wild' Stint With Bear Grylls Is Officially the Most-Watched Episode On TV

Citations

Most-watched broadcasts
Television broadcasts